Eosentomon nigeriense is a species of proturan in the family Eosentomidae, found in Africa.

References

Eosentomon
Articles created by Qbugbot
Animals described in 1979